Eric Vincent Shade (3 October 1912 – 10 March 1984) was an Australian rules footballer who played with Footscray in the Victorian Football League (VFL).

Shade later served in the Royal Australian Navy during World War II.

Notes

External links 

Eric Shade's playing statistics from The VFA Project

1912 births
1984 deaths
Australian rules footballers from Victoria (Australia)
Western Bulldogs players
Williamstown Football Club players
Royal Australian Navy personnel of World War II
Military personnel from Victoria (Australia)